The list of ship decommissionings in 1963 includes a chronological list of all ships decommissioned in 1963.


See also 

1963
 Ship decommissionings
Ship